"Sheep" is the second single released by British indie rock band the Housemartins.   It appeared on the album London 0 Hull 4.

Single details
7" - B-side: Drop Down Dead (GOD 9)
12" - I'll Be Your Shelter, Anxious, Drop Down Dead, People Get Ready (GOD x 9)

Charts

References

The Housemartins songs
1985 songs
1986 singles
Go! Discs singles
Songs written by Paul Heaton
Songs written by Stan Cullimore